Khmelevaya is a rural locality in Nizhnemedveditsky Selsoviet Rural Settlement, Kursky District, Kursk Oblast, Russia. Population:

Geography 
The village is located 96.5 km from the Russia–Ukraine border, 12 km north-west of Kursk, 2.5 km from the selsoviet center – Verkhnyaya Medveditsa.

 Climate
Khmelevaya has a warm-summer humid continental climate (Dfb in the Köppen climate classification).

Transport 
Khmelevaya is located 1 km from the federal route  Crimea Highway (a part of the European route ), on the road of intermunicipal significance  ("Crimea Highway" – Khmelevaya), 10 km from the nearest railway halt Bukreyevka (railway line Oryol – Kursk).

The rural locality is situated 14 km from Kursk Vostochny Airport, 135 km from Belgorod International Airport and 213 km from Voronezh Peter the Great Airport.

References

Notes

Sources

Rural localities in Kursky District, Kursk Oblast